Antonio Giarrusso (born February 5, 1962) is an American politician and was a Republican member of the Rhode Island House of Representatives representing District 30 from 2013 to 2018.

Education
Giarrusso attended Bryant College (now Bryant University) and earned his associate degree from the Community College of Rhode Island.

Elections
2012 When District 30 Democratic Representative Robert A. Watson retired and left the seat open, Giarrusso ran in the three-way September 11, 2012 Republican Primary, winning with 354 votes (46.2%) and won the three-way November 6, 2012 General election by 72 with 3,315 votes (44.4%) against Democratic nominee Mark Schwager and Independent candidate Kevin McDonough. On November 6, 2018, Giarrusso was defeated in his re-election bid by Democratic candidate Justine Caldwell, by a margin of 51.1%(3686 votes) to 48.8%(3517 votes).

References

External links
Official page at the Rhode Island General Assembly

Antonio Giarrusso at Ballotpedia
Antonio Giarrusso at OpenSecrets

Place of birth missing (living people)
1962 births
Living people
Bryant University alumni
Community College of Rhode Island alumni
Republican Party members of the Rhode Island House of Representatives
People from East Greenwich, Rhode Island
21st-century American politicians